Vanesa Amorós Quiles (born 7 December 1982 in Elche, Alicante province, Valencian Community, Spain) is a former Spanish handball player. She played for the Spanish national team, and competed at the 2004 Summer Olympics in Athens. and the 2012 Summer Olympics in London, where the Spanish team won the bronze medal.

She competed at the 2011 World Women's Handball Championship in Brazil, where the Spanish team placed third.

Her last club was Mecalia Atlético Guardés, a club of A Guarda, Galicia, Spain.

References

External links

1982 births
Living people
Sportspeople from Elche
Spanish female handball players
Handball players at the 2004 Summer Olympics
Olympic handball players of Spain
Olympic medalists in handball
Handball players at the 2012 Summer Olympics
Olympic bronze medalists for Spain
Medalists at the 2012 Summer Olympics
Competitors at the 2013 Mediterranean Games
Mediterranean Games competitors for Spain